Suzanne Farrell: Elusive Muse is a 1996 documentary film about the ballerina Suzanne Farrell directed by Anne Belle. It was nominated for an Academy Award for Best Documentary Feature. It was aired on PBS in 1997 as part of Great Performances: Dance In America.

References

External links

Suzanne Farrell: Elusive Muse at Direct Cinema Limited

1996 films
American documentary films
Documentary films about ballet
1990s English-language films
1990s American films